Salempur City is one of the oldest Tehsil Headquarters (founded in 1939), 71 Parliamentary Constituency which covers Vidhan Sabha of Salempur and Bhatpar Rani in Deoria district and Belthara Road, Sikanderpur and Bansdih of Ballia District. It is a Nagar Panchayat in Deoria district in the India state of Uttar Pradesh. It is one of oldest Tehsil which was founded in 1939 at the time of British Rule. It has an important Railway Station of North Eastern Railway. The Chhoti Gandak river passes through Salempur Town.

Demographics
In the past Salempur was one of the biggest Tehsils. But later it separated into three new Tehsils- Barhaj, Rudrapur and Bhatpar Rani one by one. To facilitate the administration, Salempur Tehsil is further divided into four towns and 522 villages. As of the 2011 Census of India, Salempur Tehsil of Deoria district has total population of 604,483. Out of which 298,212 are males while 306,271 are females. In 2011 there were total 91,896 families residing in Salempur Tehsil. The Average Sex Ratio of Salempur Tehsil is 1,027.
As per the 2011 census out of total population, 14.2% people lives in urban areas while 85.8% lives in the rural areas. The average literacy rate in urban areas is 76.6% while that in the rural areas is 72.9%. Also the sex ratio of urban areas in Salempur Tehsil is 951 while that of rural areas is 1,040.

The population of children of age 0–6 years in Salempur Tehsil is 87153 which is 14% of the total population. There are 45363 male children and 41790 female children between the age 0–6 years. Thus as per the 2011 the Child Sex Ratio of Salempur Tehsil is 921 which is less than Average Sex Ratio ( 1,027 ) of Salempur Tehsil.
The total literacy rate of Salempur Tehsil is 73.43%. The male literacy rate is 72.31% and the female literacy rate is 53.62% in Salempur Tehsil.

Salempur Nagarpanchayat Wards

Salempur Nagar Panchayat Religion Data 2011

History
Salempur was under Gupta and Pal dynasty. Due to thick forest all around, it was never invaded by Muslim rulers. It was under Majhauliraj (king of Majhauli). There is a famous temple of Lord Shiva at 5 km away at Dirgheshwernath, which was made by Ashwatthama when he had surrendered his mani (jewel on forehead) to Arjuna and left for Devaranya (place of forest of God) which, in present day, officially or popularly called as Deoria district.

Pipra Ramdhar There is a famous village of Gautam Vanshiya Vaidic Brahmna. Gautam and their Aradhya Devta Temple which was made by Traditional Vaidic Brahmans. Piplava-Ban is present day Pipra Ramdhar which was centrepoint of Vaidic Shastratha.

Parashurama Dham temple is in Sohnag where Parashurama stayed for one night during his journey and this place is also famous for the great Vishwakarma temple which has one among the oldest statue of lord Vishwakarma and now it is in supervision of Mr. Vishwanath Vishwakarma (chief of the temple); on every 17th of September there is a huge celebration of Vishwakarma jayanti by the Vishwakarma family which also feed a thousand of people in the name of lord Vishwakarma. Shonitpur is present day Sohanpur which was capital of Banasur. Salempur has many private schools including Little Flower High School (ICSE Board), Scholar's Public School and St. Xavier high school. It also has a Kendriya Vidyalaya and Jawahar Navodaya Vidyalaya, a CBSE Board school run by Central Government. There are government colleges, too for higher studies as Bapu Inter College,GNET Computer Institute, Janta Inter College Chakarawa Barsipar Salempur, and Rainathinter College.

Flora and fauna
Salempur has a very low proportion of forested area. The total area under forest (12.66 percent) is much less than the state average, which is barely around 7 percent. The forest area is negligible in the district. Shisham, Dhak, Mahua, Babul, Neem, Peepal, Ashok, Khajur, Mango and Gular trees are grown here. Different varieties of mangoes specially Dasheri are grown in Goplapur and Haraiya block of the district and exported to other countries, too. The main crops are wheat, paddy, rice, sugarcane, mustard, and potatoes. Vegetables such as cauliflower, cabbage, tomato, and brinjals are grown here. Similarly, sunflowers, roses, and marigolds are cultivated on a large area of the land. Also, many medicinal and herbal plants are grown here. The City Zoological Garden made efforts to bring chinkaras to the Salempur zoo. Common Indian monkeys are found in patches in and around city forests (like Moosa Bagh).

Transport Infrastructure 
Salempur is a Constituency and have interconnected roads for all district of UP. The state highwary Deoria Salempur Road Uttar Pradesh State Highway 79 passes from here.

National Highway 727A, commonly referred to as NH 727A is a national highway in India. ... Gorakhpur, Deoria, Salempur - Bihar border.

The nearest Airport is Grokhpur and Kushinagar international Airport.

Salempur is a Jn . so it have a Fine tuned Railway station.

See also
Reoli

References

Cities and towns in Deoria district